Toriq Losper (born 14 April 1992) is a South African football player who plays as a midfielder for Cape Umoya United.

References

External links

1992 births
South African soccer players
Living people
Association football midfielders
Sportspeople from Cape Town
Cape Town Spurs F.C. players